Juma Volter Mwapachu (born 27 September 1942 in Mwanza, Tanzania) is a Tanzanian politician and former Secretary General of the East African Community. He replaced Amanya Mushega of Uganda who completed his five-year term on March 24, 2006.

Background
Mwapachu was nominated for the post by Tanzanian President Jakaya Mrisho Kikwete. He was elected as Secretary General of the East African Community by the Summit of EAC Heads of State on April 4, 2006. Prior to this appointment, Mwapachu was Ambassador Extraordinary and Plenipotentiary and Tanzania's permanent delegate to UNESCO.

Mwapachu is a law graduate of the University of Dar es Salaam (degree obtained in 1969). He also holds a Postgraduate Diploma in International Law, International Institutions and Diplomacy from the Indian Academy of International Law and Diplomacy, New Delhi, India. The University of Dar es Salaam conferred on him a Doctor of Literature degree (Honoris Causa) in 2005.

Some of his posts prior to his appointment as the Secretary General of the EAC were:
Working with the Ministry of Local Government and Regional Administration in the 1970s.
Tanzania’s High Commissioner in New Delhi, India.
Chairman of the Board of Directors of the Tanzania Railways Corporation.
A commissioner of the Presidential Parastatal Sector Reform Commission.
The Chairman of the Confederation of Tanzania Industries among others.
Member of the Governing Council, Society for International Development.

Works
Confronting New Realities: Reflections on Tanzania’s Radical Transformation
Management of Public Enterprises in Developing Countries
Local Perspectives on Globalization; The African Case (co-written with J. Semboja, E. Jansen)
President of the Society for International Development

References

External links
  Juma Mwapachu Takes Over As Secretary General

1942 births
Living people
Tanzanian politicians
Permanent Delegates of Tanzania to UNESCO
Tanzanian diplomats
East African Community officials
High Commissioners of Tanzania to India
University of Dar es Salaam alumni
Tabora Boys Secondary School alumni
Mkwawa Secondary School alumni